This is a list of episodes from the eighth season of Columbo, nearly 11 years after the seventh season's end.

Episodes

References

Columbo 08
1989 American television seasons
The ABC Mystery Movie